The 10th NKP Salve Challenger Trophy was an Indian domestic cricket tournament that was held in Mumbai from 7 February to 10 February 2005. The series involved the domestic and national players from India who were allocated in India Seniors, India A, and India B. India A defeated India Seniors by 6 wickets in the final to become the champions of the tournament.

Squads

Points Table

Matches

Group stage

Final

References

Indian domestic cricket competitions